Anderson S. Bush (December 24, 1837 – July 2, 1917) was an American politician in the state of Washington. He served in the Washington House of Representatives from 1893 to 1899.

References

1837 births
1917 deaths
People from Yates County, New York
Republican Party members of the Washington House of Representatives
Silver Republican Party politicians
19th-century American politicians